The Danish Growth Fund  is Denmark's investment fund. The Danish Growth Fund is an independent fund governed by an independent legal act and an independent board of directors. The act concerning The Danish Growth Fund stipulates that the fund must promote growth and renewal for small and medium-sized enterprises in order to achieve a greater socio-economic return. The fund contributes to the creation of new companies by providing capital and expertise. Since 1992, The Danish Growth Fund has co-financed growth in more than 5,400 companies with a total commitment of more than DKK 15 billion. The Danish Growth Fund provides loans and guarantees in collaboration with Danish financial institutions. Through the department for venture capital, VF Venture, the fund invests equity in SME's. In 2013, the companies co-financed by The Danish Growth Fund had over 41,000 employees in total.

References

External links 
 About The Danish Growth Fund
 The management of The Danish Growth Fund
 The board of directors of The Danish Growth Fund
 The financing options of The Danish Growth Fund

Sovereign wealth funds
Economy of Denmark